Hannu Frans Vilhelm Oja (born December 17, 1950 in Jämsä) is a Finnish mathematical statistician and biostatistician known for his contribution to nonparametric inference, robust statistics, and multivariate statistical methods. He introduced the Oja median for multivariate distributions.

Education and career 
Oja was born in Jämsä and studied in high school in Tampere (Tampereen klassillinen lyseo). He received his MSc in statistics at the University of Tampere in 1973 and his doctorate in 1981 at the University of Oulu under the supervision of Elja Arjas. Oja stayed on at the University of Oulu as a lecturer after his PhD. He later moved to Jyväskylä University. He was professor of biometrics at University of Tampere's Department of Health Sciences and an academy professor at the university from 2008 to 2012. He's current a professor in mathematics at University of Turku.

Oja has done research especially in the field of nonparametric statistical methods. He has also conducted applied statistical research in the fields of biometrics, signal processing, machine learning, and nutrition and health sciences. Oja became a fellow of the Institute of Mathematical Statistics in 2009.

Bibliography

Books

Reviews

References 

1950 births
People from Jämsä
University of Oulu alumni
Academic staff of the University of Oulu
Academic staff of the University of Jyväskylä
Academic staff of the University of Turku
Finnish statisticians
20th-century Finnish mathematicians
21st-century Finnish mathematicians
Mathematical statisticians
University of Tampere alumni
Academic staff of the University of Tampere
Biostatisticians
Fellows of the Institute of Mathematical Statistics
Living people